The 1992 National Soccer League season was the sixth ninth and final season under the National Soccer League (NSL) name. The season began May 8, 1992, with Richmond Hill Kick facing North York Atletico Argentina at Centennial Park Stadium. The season concluded with Toronto Croatia securing the league double (NSL Championship and league cup). Croatia would defeat the North York Atletico Argentina SC for the NSL Ontario Cup by a score of 2-1 at Centennial Park Stadium in Etobicoke, Ontario. 

The season marked the final usage of the National Soccer League banner and was changed to Canadian National Soccer League in 1993. The change occurred due to the financial collapse of the Canadian Soccer League (CSL) and its merger with the National Soccer League.

Overview  
The majority of the teams returned for the season with the addition of Richmond Hill Kick. The departing clubs were North York Strikers and Scarborough International. Toronto Italia was involved in several friendly matches with notable Italian clubs such as Inter Milan, and S.S. Lazio. Toronto initially faced Lazio on May 30, 1992, and later played against Inter Milan on June 5, 1992, both concluded in a losing effort. In late 1992, reports of financial instability regarding the Canadian Soccer League were becoming apparent as several of the league's Ontario clubs were expressing a desire to join the National Soccer League. The following season the Canadian Soccer League was suspended by the Canadian Soccer Association, and was amalgamated into the National Soccer League and became known as the Canadian National Soccer League.

Teams

Final standings

References

External links
RSSSF CNSL page
thecnsl.com - 1992 season

1992–93 domestic association football leagues
National Soccer League
1992